Loving is a 1970 American comedy-drama film released by Columbia Pictures and directed by Irvin Kershner. It is based on the novel Brooks Wilson Ltd. written by pulp magazine illustrator John McDermott under his pen name J.M. Ryan. The movie starred George Segal in the lead role of a philandering illustrator and Eva Marie Saint as his wife. The cast included Sterling Hayden, David Doyle, Keenan Wynn, Roy Scheider, and Sherry Lansing.  Broadway actress Betsy von Furstenberg has a small uncredited role, only one of two motion pictures she ever appeared in.

Plot
Brooks Wilson is a busy man, juggling his work as a commercial artist with a marriage to Selma, and two young daughters. He also has a girlfriend on the side, Grace, who wants him to commit to her, but he cannot do it.

Brooks is trying desperately to land an elusive account from Lepridon, but this is seeming harder to achieve than he thought. One evening they attend a party at a grand Connecticut home. Feeling his life is falling apart, Brooks seduces flirty Nelly, wife of his associate Will. They go to a children's playhouse outside the main house, and their indiscretions are caught on closed-circuit television. Selma and Will are devastated. Brooks and Will fall into a fist-fight. After the commotion dies down, the harried Brooks tells Selma that he finally landed the Lepridon account. She smacks him with her handbag, and they stare at each other in silence, seeing their marriage honestly for the first time.

Cast
George Segal as Brooks Wilson
Eva Marie Saint as Selma Wilson
Sterling Hayden as Mr. Lepridon
Keenan Wynn as Edward
Nancie Phillips as Nelly Parks
Janis Young as Grace
David Doyle as Will Parks
Paul Sparer as Marve
Andrew Duncan as Willy Wulfman
Sherry Lansing as Susan
Roland Winters as Tom "Plommie" Plommer
Edgar Stehli as Mr. Kramm
Calvin Holt as Danny
Mina Kolb as Diane
Diana Douglas as Mrs. Shavelson
David Ford as Al
James Manis as Charles
Mart Hulswit as Ted
John Fink as Brad
William Duffy as Jay
Irving Selbst as Benny
Martin Harvey Friedberg as Roger
Lorraine Cullen as Lizzie Wilson
Cheryl Bucher as Hannah Wilson
Ed Crowley as Mr. Shavelson
Roy Scheider as Skip Geiser
Sab Shimono as Byron
Eileen O'Neill as Cindy
Diane Davies as Barbie

Critical reception
The film has generally been well received by critics. Steven Scheuer found the film "quietly intense" and "humorous, human, and insightful", but found the film's final scene "incongruous in its farcical mayhem," (Scheuer, 1990: 641). On the other hand, Leonard Maltin found the film's climax "superb" and praised the director on his "great feeling for day-to-day detail [of the characters' lives]" (Maltin, 1991: 730).

Roger Ebert found the film "an amusing and intelligent comedy of manners" (Ebert, 1970) with a great central performance by George Segal. Clive Hirschhorn noted that while the film was "well-observed", and was truly "Segal's film", it was still "uneven" in content (Hirschhorn, 1989: 285). Perhaps the review that most sums up the film comes from Leslie Halliwell, "smart New York sex comedy, typical of many but better than most," (Halliwell, 2000: 496).

See also
 List of American films of 1970

References

External links
 
 
 

1970 films
1970 drama films
American drama films
Columbia Pictures films
1970s English-language films
Films based on American novels
Films directed by Irvin Kershner
Films set in Connecticut
Films set in New York City
Films scored by Bernardo Segall
1970s American films